The language of flowers, or floriography, is cryptological communication through the use or arrangement of flowers.

(The) Language of Flowers may also refer to:
Hanakotoba, the Japanese language of flowers
 Language of Flowers (band), an indie-pop band
 "The Language of Flowers" (Elgar), an 1872 song by Edward Elgar based on a poem by James Gates Percival
 The Language of Flowers (Lorca), a 1935 play by Federico García Lorca
 The Language of Flowers (novel), a 2011 novel by Vanessa Diffenbaugh
 "The Language of Flowers", an episode in the 2003 TV series Rosemary & Thyme